Petalonyx linearis is a species of flowering plant in the family Loasaceae known by the common name narrowleaf sandpaper plant. It is native to the deserts of eastern California, western Arizona and northwestern Mexico, where it grows in scrub and other habitat. It is a rounded clumpy subshrub made up of many rough-haired, erect stems up to a meter tall.

The cylindrical stems are lined evenly with linear to widely lance-shaped leaves 1 to 2.5 centimeters long. The inflorescence at the end of each stem is a raceme of many small five-petalled white flowers surrounded by rounded or oval bracts with pointed, lobed, or notched tips.

External links
Jepson Manual Treatment
UC Photos gallery

Loasaceae
Flora of the California desert regions
Flora of the Sonoran Deserts
Flora of Arizona
Flora of Northwestern Mexico
Natural history of the Colorado Desert
Taxa named by Edward Lee Greene